Macha Grenon (born June 7, 1968) is a Canadian film and television actress.

Born in Montreal, Quebec, Grenon's credits include roles in the television series Urban Angel, Scoop, Le cœur a ses raisons, Emily of New Moon, Nouvelle adresse and H2O, as well as the films The Pianist, Stardom, Familia, Windsor Protocol, You Can Thank Me Later, Days of Darkness (L'Âge des ténèbres), Barney's Version and The Year Dolly Parton Was My Mom. She garnered a Best Actress nomination at the 26th Genie Awards for her performance in Familia.

Her father, Michel Grenon, was a history professor at the Université du Québec à Montréal, and her grandfather, Hector Grenon, was a historian who wrote several books on the history of Montreal.

Selected filmography
 The Myth of the Male Orgasm - 1993
 Mistaken Identity (Erreur sur la personne) - 1996
 The Ideal Man (L'Homme idéal) - 1996
 Family Pack (Que faisaient les femmes pendant que l'homme marchait sur la lune?) - 2000
 Dead Awake - 2001
 The Child Prodigy (L'Enfant prodige) - 2010
 The Year Dolly Parton Was My Mom - 2011
 April and the Twisted World - 2015
 Boundaries - 2016

References

External links

1968 births
Actresses from Montreal
Canadian film actresses
Canadian television actresses
Living people
French Quebecers